Bockstadt is a village and a former municipality in the district of Hildburghausen, in Thuringia, Germany. Since 31 December 2013, it is part of the town Eisfeld.

References

Former municipalities in Thuringia
Duchy of Saxe-Meiningen